Kudallur is in the Palakkad district of Kerala. It is in Pattambi taluk, bordering Malappuram district, also on the banks of Bharathapuzha. The Bharathappuzha river separates Kudallur from Kuttippuram town in Malappuram district. Kudallur is a part of Thrithala (State Assembly constituency) and Ponnani (Lok Sabha constituency).

Kudallur is the meeting point of three Taluks - Pattambi Taluk, Ponnani taluk (neighbouring Thavanur village in Malappuram district), and Tirur Taluk (neighbouring Kuttippuram town).

Administration
This village was originally in Ponnani taluk, before the formation of Malappuram district on 16 June 1969. The famous Malayalam writer M. T. Vasudevan Nair was born there. Kudallur is in the Palakkad district of Kerala.The other well-known personality from here is artist Achutan Kudallur.Among the eminent personalities of the past P.K. Moideen Kutty Sahib dominates a prominent position. He was a great Freedom Fighter who was put in British jail for several years. P.K. Moideen Kutty Sahib was an elected member to  Madras Assembly  in 1937. He also served as president at KPCC  Kerala Pradesh Congress Committee and  All India Congress Committee  AICC member.During the flood of1942, P.K. Moideen Kutty Sahib worked as a front-line warrior of all relief activities. He also played a vital role to restart the construction of  Kuttippuram bridge  which had been blocked because of  World War II 

His cousin P.K. Abdulla Kutty Sahib was another Freedom Fighter from this area. He spent many years in Kannur and Viyyoor Jails during British reign. He was well-known Gandhian and participated in “Khadi-Prasthan” in the post British era.

Kudallur, a beautiful and calm Kerala village on the banks of Bharathapuzha is in the Ottappalam taluk of Palakkad district. Scenic range of hills, wide paddy fields and the magic beauty of River Nila blends Kudallur into an exotic place. The village is famous for its illustrious son writer M.T.Vasudevan Nair. The other well known personality from here is artist Achutan Kudallur. It is at Kudallur, exactly at Koottakadavu the two rivers Nila and Thootha meet. The name 'Kudallur' ( or Koodal Ooru ) is believed to be formed from this merge of two rivers.

Geography
It is at Kudallur, exactly at Koottakadavu the two rivers Nila and Thootha meet. Therefore, it is said that the place got the name from the confluence of these rivers, with 'koodal' meaning joining and 'oor' meaning place in Malayalam, thus a meeting place of the rivers. Kudallur Hills, mentioned in Nair's stories, are another point of attraction. The village is in Anakkara Panchayath, Thrithala block i.e. in Pattambi Taluk.'Vadakkumuri','Muthu Vilayum Kunnu' and 'Paarappuram' are important residential areas of Koodallur.

Kudallur
The other Kudallur is located in Pattambi taluk in Palakkad district itself, on the northern banks of Gayathripuzha River, a tributary of Bharathapuzha. Nemmara is the nearest town from Kudallur. The late historian Prof.K V Krishna Iyer hails from this Kudallur..

References

 .
 .

External links 
 http://www.kudallur.com/

Villages in Palakkad district